GOE or Goe may refer to:

Special forces
 GOE (Brazil), a police tactical unit of the Civil Police of the state of São Paulo
 Special Operations Group (Argentina), of the Argentine Air Force
 Special Operations Group (Portugal), of the Portuguese Public Security Police
 Special Operations Groups (Spain), of the Spanish Army

Other uses 
 Field Flowers Goe (1832–1910), Australian Anglican bishop
 Gaussian orthogonal ensemble, a random matrix ensemble
 Go (airline), a defunct British airline
 Go (game), or goe, an abstract strategy game
 Goldthorpe railway station, in England
 Gongduk language, spoken in Bhutan 
 Gouais blanc, a French wine grape
 Government Olympic Executive, of the United Kingdom
 Government-owned enterprise
 Grade of execution in figure skating
 Great Oxygenation Event, the Paleoproterozoic surge in atmospheric oxygen

See also
Go (disambiguation)